Cizí zeď is song in Czech and Slovak released to the 1/10 campaign by ONEMANSHOW Foundation. The song was premiered on Stream.cz on September 12, 2018 in the video Odhalení skandálu prohrané sázky o Ferrari za 8 000 000 Kč. This video received 1,000,000 views in less than 1 day. On Youtube, a video clip with the song was uploaded a day later - September 13, 2018. The video was placed in Czech Trends in a few hours. After less than a day he reached #1 in Czech YouTube Trends, holding this position for quite some time.  1 week after release, the video had 1.9 million views on Youtube.

Credits

Singers 

 Ewa Farna
 Lucie Bílá
 Jiří Macháček
 Ondřej Hejma
Ondřej Brzobohatý
Terezie Kovalová
Kuba Ryba
Jakub Děkan
Sebastian
Vojtěch Dyk
Vojta D
Iva Pazderková
Emma Smetana
 Bára Basiková
 Tomáš Klus
Richard Krajčo (from band Kryštof)
Mirai Navrátil (from band Mirai)
Mariana Prachařová
Pepa Vojtek
Adam Mišík
 Ondřej Ládek aka Xindl X
Michal Malátný (from band Chinaski)
 Deborah Kahl aka Debbie
Jan Pokorný aka Pokáč
Václav Lebeda aka Voxel
Tomáš Maček aka Thom Artway
Jan Beding
Milan Peroutka

Rap 

 Adam Svatoš aka Kato
 Michal Dušička aka Majk Spirit
Michal Straka aka Ego

Lyrics 

Pokáč
Ondřej Fiedler

Others 

 Ondřej Brzobohatý – piano
 Robert Picka – studio engineer
 Jan Steinsdorfer – symphonic arrangements
 Terezie Kovalová – violoncello
 Jan Bradáč – violin
 Lukáš Chromek – guitars
 Marcel Procházka – supervision of harmony
 Boris Carloff – studio soundevice
 Hana Vinglerova – choir
 Jan Steninsdorfer, Karla Sluková – orchestra
 Hanz Sedlář – conductor

Gallery

References

External links 

 Episode of One Man Show, in which the song was premiered
 Official YouTube music video

Czech-language songs
Slovak-language songs
2018 songs
2018 singles